The Thomas Cook Travel Book Award originated as an initiative of Thomas Cook AG in 1980, with the aim of encouraging and rewarding the art of literary travel writing. The awards stopped in 2005 (2004 being the last year an award was given). As of 2008, the only other travel book award in Britain is the Dolman Best Travel Book Award, begun in 2006.

Winners
Source:
2004, Richard Grant, Ghost Riders: Travels with American Nomads
2003, Jenny Diski, Stranger on a Train: Daydreaming and Smoking around America With Interruptions
2002, Ma Jian, Red Dust: A Path Through China 
2001, Stanley Stewart, In the Empire of Genghis Khan: An Amazing Odyssey Through the Lands of the Most Feared Conquerors in History 
2000, Jason Elliot, An Unexpected Light: Travels in Afghanistan
1999, Philip Marsden, The Spirit-Wrestlers: A Russian Journey
1998, Tim Mackintosh-Smith, Yemen:Travels in Dictionary Land
1997, Nicholas Crane, Clear Waters Rising: A Mountain Walk Across Europe 
1996, Stanley Stewart, Frontiers of Heaven: A Journey to the End of China 
1995, Gavin Bell, In Search of Tusitala: Travels in the Pacific After Robert Louis Stevenson 
1994, William Dalrymple, City of Djinns
1993, Nick Cohn, The Heart of the World 
1992, Norman Lewis, A Goddess in the Stones: Travels in India
1991, co-winners:
Jonathan Raban, Hunting Mister Heartbreak: A Discovery of America
Gavin Young, In Search of Conrad
1990, Mark Hudson, Our Grandmothers’ Drums 
1989, Paul Theroux, Riding the Iron Rooster
1988, Colin Thubron, Behind the Wall: A Journey Through China
1986/87, Patrick Leigh Fermor, Between the Woods & the Water 
1985, Patrick Marnham, So Far From God: Journey to Central America 
1984, Geoffrey Moorhouse, To The Frontier 
1983, Vikram Seth, From Heaven Lake: Travels Through Sinkiang and Tibet 
1982, Tim Severin, The Sinbad Voyage 
1981, Jonathan Raban, Old Glory: An American Voyage
1980, Robyn Davidson, Tracks

References

External links

Travel writing
British non-fiction literary awards
Awards established in 1980
1980 establishments in the United Kingdom
Awards disestablished in 2004
2004 disestablishments in the United Kingdom